Skyler Bowlin (born July 7, 1989) is an American professional basketball player for the Bakken Bears of the Danish Basketligaen. Bowlin plays at both the point guard and shooting guard positions.

Professional career
In the 2015–16 season, he was named the Basketligan Finals MVP after he won the Basketligan with the Södertälje Kings. After the season in Sweden ended, he signed with Gießen 46ers for the 2016–17 season. In 33 games, Bowlin averaged 8.8 points and 4.1 assists for Gießen.

On May 13, 2017, Bowlin signed with Science City Jena for the 2017–18 season. He averaged 11.6 points and 5.2 assists per game. Bowlin signed a two-year deal with s.Oliver Würzburg on May 25, 2018.

On July 19, 2020, Bowlin officially signed with Iraklis of the Greek Basket League. On February 18, 2021, Bowlin parted ways with the Greek club. Following a stint at Basket Zielona Góra in Poland, Bowlin returned to the German Bundesliga, agreeing terms with the Telekom Baskets Bonn in June 2021.

In June 2022, he inked a two-year deal with the Bakken Bears of the Danish Basketligaen.

Honours

Club
Horsens IC
Basketligaen: 2014–15
Danish Cup: 2015
Södertälje Kings
Basketligan: 2015–16

Individual
Basketligaen MVP: 2015
Danish Cup MVP: 2015
Basketligan Finals MVP: 2016

References

External links
German League bio
Missouri Southern Lions bio

1989 births
Living people
American expatriate basketball people in Austria
American expatriate basketball people in Denmark
American expatriate basketball people in Germany
American expatriate basketball people in Sweden
American men's basketball players
Basketball players from Arkansas
Giessen 46ers players
Flyers Wels players
Horsens IC players
Iraklis Thessaloniki B.C. players
Missouri Southern Lions men's basketball players
People from Paragould, Arkansas
Point guards
Science City Jena players
Shooting guards
Södertälje Kings players
s.Oliver Würzburg players
Telekom Baskets Bonn players